Henrik Kristoffersen (born 2 July 1994) is a Norwegian World Cup alpine ski racer, World Champion, and Olympic medalist. He specializes in the technical events of slalom and giant slalom.

Career
Born in Rælingen in Akershus county, Kristoffersen made his World Cup debut in March 2012 in Kranjska Gora, Slovenia, and attained his first podium in November 2013, a third-place finish in slalom at Levi, Finland. At the 2014 Winter Olympics in Sochi, Kristoffersen won the bronze medal in slalom at Rosa Khutor at age 19 to become the youngest male medalist in Olympic alpine skiing history.

Kristoffersen is the first to win the three classic slalom races in Adelboden, Wengen, and Kitzbühel in the same season; accomplished at age 21 in January 2016. During this run, he became the most successful Norwegian in the history of World Cup slalom competition. With his seventh win at Wengen, Kristoffersen tied Finn Christian Jagge, and the eighth came a week later in Kitzbühel to set the record. His ninth slalom victory was two days later (26 January), at the Schladming night race.

At the World Championships in 2019, Kristoffersen won the gold medal in the giant slalom at Åre, Sweden.

Achievements
Kristoffersen is the first to win the four classic slalom races (of Adelboden, Wengen, Kitzbühel, and Schladming) in a single season.

In the 2016 season, Kristoffersen became the first male racer in 24 years to win six World Cup slalom races during a single season; Alberto Tomba won nine World Cup races (six slalom, three giant slalom) in the 1992 season.

World Cup results

Season titles

Season standings

Race victories

World Championship results

Olympic results

See also
 List of FIS Alpine Ski World Cup men's race winners

References

External links

 
 
 
 

1994 births
Norwegian male alpine skiers
Alpine skiers at the 2014 Winter Olympics
Alpine skiers at the 2018 Winter Olympics
Alpine skiers at the 2022 Winter Olympics
Olympic alpine skiers of Norway
Medalists at the 2014 Winter Olympics
Medalists at the 2018 Winter Olympics
Olympic medalists in alpine skiing
Olympic silver medalists for Norway
Olympic bronze medalists for Norway
People from Rælingen
Living people